Godfred Bakiweyem (born 20 December 1998) is a Ghanaian cricketer. He was named in Ghana's squad for the 2017 ICC World Cricket League Division Five tournament in South Africa. He played in Ghana's opening fixture, against Germany, on 3 September 2017.

In May 2019, he was named in Ghana's squad for the Regional Finals of the 2018–19 ICC T20 World Cup Africa Qualifier tournament in Uganda. He made his Twenty20 International (T20I) debut for Ghana against Kenya on 21 May 2019.

References

External links
 

1998 births
Living people
Ghanaian cricketers
Ghana Twenty20 International cricketers
Place of birth missing (living people)